Miomir Kecmanović was the defending champion, but chose to compete at the Summer Olympics instead.

Casper Ruud won his fifth ATP Tour title, defeating Pedro Martínez in the final, 6–1, 4–6, 6–3. It was Ruud's third consecutive title in as many weeks.

Seeds
The top four seeds receive a bye into the second round.

Draw

Finals

Top half

Bottom half

Qualifying

Seeds

Qualifiers

Lucky losers

Qualifying draw

First qualifier

Second qualifier

Third qualifier

Fourth qualifier

References

 Main draw
 Qualifying draw

2021 ATP Tour
2021 Singles